Calcio Lecco 1912, better known as Lecco , is a  football club in Lecco, Lombardy, Italy. The club currently plays in Serie C, the third division of the Italian Football.

Founded in 1912, it has played in three Serie A tournaments (the last of which in the  1966–1967 season) and eleven in Serie B (the last of which in the year  1972–1973). He includes in his palmarès the victory of one Italian Semi-professional Cup in the national field, and one Anglo-Italian Cup in the international field.

History

From  Società Canottieri Lecco  to ' 'Associazione Calcio Lecco' '

The football section of the city of Lecco was officially born on 22 December 1912 thanks to the idea of Vico Signorelli, member of the board of directors of the Società Canottieri Lecco, established on 27 September 1895 in the Caffè del Teatro Sociale. Since its foundation, the team's colors have been blue-celestial, inspired by the Canottieri uniform. The first historical headquarters of the company was located in via Francesco Nullo.

On April 13, 1912, the Blucelesti played their first match against Milan Cricket and Football Club, 4–1 thanks to the opposing goals of Saverio and Rigoli, then, in the first years of competitive activity, Lecco played friendly matches and tournaments on a regional and local scale at the "Primavera" pitch trained by Achille Todeschini and then making his debut in an official championship organized by F.I.G.C. in the 1920–1921 season starting from the Promotion championship and reaching the finals-promotion for "Prima Categoria", touching the feat after the 0–0 against the comaschi of Esperia.

A year later, in 1922, after Eugenio Ceppi's election as president of the club, the stadium where the blue-celestial players still play their home matches was inaugurated, called "Campo sportivo di via Cantarelli", today stadium Rigamonti-Ceppi.

On 22 July 1931, after having formed a provisional commission, Canottieri decided to leave the football sector due to the high economic efforts required and, to avoid the dissolution of the team, the ' Associazione Calcio Lecco 'was created. ', with Professor Gennaro Pensa as the first president and Mario Ceppi, son of the former president of Canottieri Eugenio Ceppi who died in 1931, as a member of the board of directors who will be the protagonist of the club's golden years. The first headquarters of this new company was the Salone del Caffè Commercio in Piazza XX Settembre.

From the era-Ceppi to the arrival in Serie A 

In the second football decade, Lecco played championships at a decent level, at first remaining in the running for promotion to Serie B during the season in First Division 1931-1932 until the last day, until the last minute, then always remaining in the new Serie C finishing the championship between the high and medium-low positions of the standings.

At the corporate level, the situation was dramatic due to a great and serious economic crisis that was resolved in the summer of 1941 when the Provincial Committee of the C.O.N.I. appoints the accountant Mario Ceppi as extraordinary commissioner, who thanks also to local political aid , he succeeded in saving the Lecco football by smoothing out most of the debts. In the post-war period, during the 1945–1946 season the blu-celesti participated in the mixed Serie B-C Alta Italia, ending the season in second place behind the Pro Patria and managing to earn the play-off to access the finals for the promotion in A. In the play-off, however, at the Milan Arena the match ended 0–0 and the Federation subsequently canceled one of the bustocchi's matches by ordering the repetition of the match that brought Lecco third one step away from Serie A.

In the following years, from 1946 to 1948, Lecco collected two relegations, one of which caused by the new federal regulation that made Lecco overhang in the Promotion championship.

On 3 August 1948, a revolution began for Lecco with the appointment of Mario Ceppi as president, who led the team to a period of unstoppable growth and a leap in quality towards the highest category. During his stay at the top of the blue, Lecco in the space of seven years in which he concluded the seasons in Serie C starting from  championship 1953–1954 always in the top positions of the standings , except for a brief parenthesis in Series IV, thanks to Angelo Piccioli on the bench, a former blue-sky player, in the Serie B 1959-1960 season, he won the Serie A to the team amid the enthusiasm of the fans and of an entire city.

The adventure in Serie A for Lecco began on 25 September 1960, when in their debut in the top flight, the Blucelesti lost 4–0 away to Fiorentina. The first victory for the Blucelesti in the top flight came on 9 October when on the slopes of Resegone, Lecco beat Padova at home for 2–1 and after a season of ups and downs culminating in the play-offs -final salvation against Udinese and  Bari, the Lecchesi saved themselves tooth and nail thanks to Arienti's goals.

In the following season, in Serie A, although the team was strengthened with the purchase of Bengt Lindskog and Beniamino Di Giacomo, the Blucelesti were relegated in Serie B to the penultimate place before with Angelo Piccioli and then with Camillo Achilli on the bench.
After four top cadet championships in Serie B from the championship  1962–1963 to the season (1965–1966) the Blucelesti managed to earn their last championship of Serie A in the season 1966–1967, always with Angelo Piccioli at the helm, but in the last year the team suffered in the back, with a surprise in the last game, when the team already relegated , managed to snatch a 1–1 to A.C. Milan at San Siro thanks to a goal by Schiavo.

Serie C and the last season in Serie B 
Once the glories of Serie A ended, a two-year hell period began for the Blucelesti in Serie B (also known as Cadetteria), where the volcanic presidentissimo  Mario Ceppi in 1967 left the presidency to Giovanni Mambretti and then returned to the club a short time later, where in first year of Serie B, the team survived the play-offs, beating the competition of  Messina and Venezia and then relegated to Serie C  the following year closing in penultimate place in the standings with Renato Gei on the bench.

The first year in Serie C, Lecco barely touched the return to Serie B, collecting a series of eight consecutive useful games and reaching only one point from the top of the table thanks to nine goals from Pedroni, then, in the following two seasons in the third series, the team first finished the championship in eighth place and subsequently, in the tournament of  Serie C 1971–72, the Bucelesti found the Serie B after three years winning group A.

The championship of Serie B 1972-1973 for Lecco was not easy and was characterized by excellent sales such as that of Chinellato and the technical changes that led to the exemption of  Angelo Longoni  and the bench call of Francesco Meregalli which brought the team to the last place in the standings with only 25 points.

From that moment on, for Lecco football after the "era-Ceppi" began a slow decline that brought the team up to the amateur categories.

From post-Ceppi to the 2000s 
 
The seven years that followed between Serie C and the new Serie C1 from 1974 to 1980 with Carlo Rizza as the new helmsman of the company in place of Ceppi who died on 15 June 1983, the team sailed in mid-ranking positions and then relegated to Serie C2 from  season 1979–1980, at the end of the third consecutive championship in the fourth professional division, the Blucelesti sank in the Interregional Championship gained after a last place in the standings.

After the change of ownership, and the arrival of Alberto Frigerio, a difficult period began for Lecco due to the unfulfilled promises of the top management to bring the club back to Serie C2 quickly and the wrong market choices that led to the Blucelesti to touch several times the return among the professionals. Among these sensational that occurred in the 1985–86 season with the hiring as technician of the unknown Agostino Alzani, such as to "burst" the "Alzani grain": a large part of the blue people , including the Lecco Club Mario Ceppi, said he was ready to totally desert the stadium if Lecco was confirmed for the entire season, which, after an Italian Cup match, was exonerated already at the end of the first day of championship, as well as quickly replaced by the President with Stefano Angeleri. 

The satisfactions came, at the end of the Interregional Championship 1989-1990, when after six years spent among the amateurs, the Blucelesti after a second final place were fished in Serie C2 to complete organic.

Between amateurism and professionalism 
At the end of the championship Lega Pro Second Division the company was purchased by the Italian-American entrepreneur Joseph Cala in 2012, former ex-president of the Salernitana for 11 days, becoming part of the holding company Cala Corporation, a company listed on the US stock exchange.

Cala's presidency lasted forty-two days, after which he left the team due to the impossibility of managing it, also leading to the resignation of Paolo Cesana, who had declared a disorganization that made it impossible to work within society.

The company was then managed transiently by Mario Micheli as president pro tempore, to then pass ownership to the company One hundred blue, made up of Lecco entrepreneurs, with president Antonio Rusconi.

During spring 2014 Stefano Galati became president of the association and during summer 2014 he was joined by Daniele Bizzozero as majority shareholder. Shortly thereafter, in August, Galati resigned and Bizzozero acquired the entire share package of the company, appointing the former Nerazzurri star as new president Evaristo Beccalossi ( which will resign in 2016 to enter the corporate cadres of Brera di Milan). In the 2014-2015 Serie D championship the team fought in the top positions, finally closing their group in second place, behind the Castiglione. A similar result was obtained in the D 2015-2016 Series, where the Blucelesti placed second in their group behind the solo Piacenza and they accessed the playoffs, which finally won by passing Pontisola and Seregno, acquiring the pre-emption for any repechage in Lega Pro.

However, the good results on the field were accompanied by a growing corporate instability: in 2016 the patron Daniele Bizzozero was twice reached by measures of pre-trial detention for judicial problems unrelated to the team. At the same time, the sole director Sandro Meregalli was commissioned to enter into negotiations aimed at the sale of the Blucelesti to new buyers, without however obtaining any concrete results. The accounting situation worsened more and more: already in May 2016 various corporate assets ( including the benches of the Rigamonti-Ceppi stadium and there'bus of the first team ) came foreclosed and auctioned in the summer months. Also in summer 2016, considerable difficulties were encountered in registering for the 2016-2017 championship: it proved impossible to access the Lega Pro, in July the club was re-registered in extremis to Series D.

Calcio Lecco 1912 s.p.a. was finally declared failed by the city court on December 5 2016: the corporate offices were completely eliminated and the club was placed in provisional exercise under the direction of the curator Mario Motta, in charge of ending the sports season and holding the club up to the liquidation auction. In order to relieve the social debt situation ( quantified in a liability of more than one million euros ), the trustee decided first of all to exempt the coach Stefano Cuoghi, whose compensation had been deemed disproportionate to the possibilities of the extraordinary administration: in its place was called the former Blucelesti player Alberto Bertolini, already hired by the previous management for a few days in October 2016. The squad, orphaned by various players who freed themselves following the club's arrears, was integrated with elements of the youth selections. Again in order to find the funds necessary for the regular performance of the club's activities, Motta proposed to third parties ( private individuals and companies ) to take charge directly of paying the engagement of the players, also appealing to subscriptions by fans.

Despite the above difficulties, the Blucelesti team managed to close the regular season in 16th place and finally to save themselves by defeating the playouts'Olginatese for 2-3.

At the end of the championship, on May 29 the auction for the purchase of tangible and intangible assets ( debt liabilities included ) of the failed Calcio Lecco 1912 was convened, which ( in spite of some expressions of interest, then incorrectly formalized ) ended up deserted: in agreement with the curator Motta, the city court decreed the convocation of a second enchantment for 8 and 9 June.

Just at the supplementary auction on 9 June following, the partnership was awarded to the sole tenderer, the entrepreneur brianzolo Paolo Di Nunno, who became its new owner: there newco retained the denomination Calcio Lecco 1912, but was formed in limited liability company.

After a first season closed in seventh place in its group, in the 2018-2019 vintage the Lecco ( led by the technician Marco Gaburro) dominated Serie D group A, winning it five days earlier than the end of the championship: at the end of the season the Blucelesti accumulated 86 points, with + 27 lengths in second place.

The return season in Series C ( after seven years of absence ) proves more complicated: the team stands in the low ranking of group A and this costs the place of the technician Gaburro ( replaced interim by the deputy Gianbattista Boffetti and then by Gaetano D'Agostino), as well as to the sports director Mario Tesini and the team manager Mauro Brambilla. In addition, the patron Paolo Di Nunno, who for several months had already taken to complain about the scarce presence of the public at home games, as well as a widespread climate of hostility and/or indifference towards him by fans and institutions, at the end of November 2019 he announces his resignation from corporate offices, while ensuring that support for the club continues immediately. To succeed him in the role of president is his son, Cristian Di Nunno.

Stadium
The club play their home games at the Rigamonti-Ceppi Stadium, located in via Don Pozzi, in the Castello district, which also houses the company's headquarters. At the third millennium the stadium, after adjustments to safety standards, it has a capacity of 5,000 seats.

The stadium, initially called Sports field in via Cantarelli at the time of construction, dating back to 1922, over the years has been titled a Mario Rigamonti and then also to the "very presidential" Blucelesti Mario Ceppi, after his death in the 80s.

Before the construction of the stadium in the early years of the clubs history, a playground had been set up, called Spring, in via Ponchielli.

Crest and Colours

Colours
The social colours of Lecco are blue and the celestial: the chromatic combination was invented in 1895 when the Lecco tank tops, whose first president, Antonio Cima, stated that they would best evoke the lake panorama enjoyed from the city, merging the tint of water with that of the sky. According to another theory, supported by the journalist Aaron Angleri, the colours would instead have been taken from those of a broken bucket that was located at the first registered office.

Since Lecco was born as a football section of Canottieri, it was therefore natural that it too chose the aforementioned colours for its game uniforms. Unlike the original uniform of the "mother" club, which has the colours arranged in horizontal bands, the football club has instead opted for shirts palate.

Crest

Records and statistics

Participation in the championships 
The following table takes into consideration the 86 sports seasons played in the national championships starting from the debut on 26 October 1924 in Second Division; the team also participated in the tournament of Serie B-C Alta Italia 1945-1946 with Serie C sports title and regional championships, namely:

 2 championships of Promotion of the Lombardy (1920-1921 is 1921-1922)
 2 championships of Third Division of the Lombardy (1922-1923 is 1923-1924)
 1 championship of Lombard excellence (2002-2003).

Honours

League
 Serie C (Tier 3)
 Winners (1): 1971–72
 Serie D (Tier 4)
 Winners (1): 1949–50
 Eccellenza (Tier 5)
 Winners (1): 2002–03
 Trofeo Comitato Regionale Lombardia (Tier 6)
 Winners (1): 2003

Cups
 Coppa Italia Semiprofessionisti:
 Winners (1): 1976–77
 Anglo-Italian Cup:
 Winners (1): 1977

Affiliated clubs 

  Bath City F.C.

Players

Current squad
As of 31 January 2023.

Out on loan

Former players
       Main page: Calcio Lecco players

Former managers
       Main page: Calcio Lecco managers

References

External links
Official site

 
Football clubs in Italy
Football clubs in Lombardy
Association football clubs established in 1912
Serie A clubs
Serie B clubs
Serie C clubs
1912 establishments in Italy
Coppa Italia Serie C winning clubs
Serie D clubs